The Films and Publications Act, 1996 is an act of the South African Parliament.

The act repealed a number of acts of prior legislation which censored literary and media works under that country's previous apartheid government.

It established a Film and Publication Board and Review Board. The Board's function would be to receive complaints, or applications to evaluate, a film or publication, to classify it according to its suitability for different audiences.

External links
 Films and Publications Act 65 of 1996
 Gazette notices per the Films and Publications Act, No. 65 of 1996

Censorship in South Africa
1996 in South African law
South African legislation
Film controversies in South Africa